Clover Creek is a census-designated place (CDP) located in Pierce County, Washington.

Demographics
In 2010, it had a population of 6,522 inhabitants. 3,031 are male. 3,491 are female.

Geography
Clover Creek is located at coordinates 47°8'11"N 122°21'7"W.

Education
The majority of the community is in the Franklin Pierce School District, while a portion lies in the Bethel School District.

Franklin Pierce High School is in the Clover Creek CDP. Most of the Franklin Pierce portion is zoned to Collins Elementary School, while portions north of 112th Street are zoned to Central Avenue Elementary School in Summit and Midland Elementary School in Midland. The Franklin Pierce portion of Clover Creek is zoned to Morris E. Ford Middle School in Midland and Franklin Pierce High.

References

Census-designated places in Pierce County, Washington